German submarine U-204 was a Type VIIC U-boat of the Kriegsmarine during World War II. The submarine was laid down on 22 April 1940 by the Friedrich Krupp Germaniawerft yard at Kiel as yard number 633, launched on 23 January 1941 and commissioned on 8 March under the command of Oberleutnant zur See Walter Kell.

She was sunk on 19 October 1941 by British warships.

Design
German Type VIIC submarines were preceded by the shorter Type VIIB submarines. U-204 had a displacement of  when at the surface and  while submerged. She had two shafts and two  propellers.

U-204 was fitted with five  torpedo tubes (four fitted at the bow and one at the stern), fourteen torpedoes, one  SK C/35 naval gun, 220 rounds, and a  C/30 anti-aircraft gun. The boat had a complement of between forty-four and sixty.

Service history
Part of the 1st U-boat Flotilla, U-204 carried out three patrols in the North Atlantic.

First patrol
U-204s first patrol began when she left Kiel on 24 May 1941; she travelled through the gap between Greenland and Iceland (the Denmark Strait) and sank the Icelandic fishing boat Holsteinn with gunfire, south of Iceland on 31 May – Kell did not want news of the U-boat's presence to be broadcast. She then sank Mercier east of Newfoundland on 10 June. She docked at Brest in occupied France, on the 27th.

Second patrol
Nearly a month passed before the boat sortied again. On 2 August she spotted Allied convoy SL81 and called for support. When  arrived the following day, they attacked together but without success. Eighty-four of Baths crew including her CO Lieutenant Commander Frederik Melsom were killed plus two others later died after rescue; the death toll was compounded by the fact that two depth charges exploded when the vessel went down.

Third patrol and loss
Having left Brest on 20 September 1941, she sank the Spanish sailing ship Aingeru Guardakoa with a single torpedo on 14 October, thinking she was a British submarine chaser. She then sank Inverlee on the 19th. On the same day, she fell victim to a British anti-submarine sweep from Gibraltar. She was sunk by depth charges from the corvette  and the sloop .

Forty-six men died; there were no survivors.

Wolfpacks
U-204 took part in three wolfpacks, namely:
 West (5 – 16 June 1941) 
 Kurfürst (16 – 20 June 1941) 
 Breslau (5 – 19 October 1941)

Summary of raiding history

References

Notes

Citations

Bibliography

External links

World War II submarines of Germany
German Type VIIC submarines
U-boats commissioned in 1941
U-boats sunk in 1941
U-boats sunk by British warships
U-boats sunk by depth charges
1941 ships
Ships built in Kiel
Ships lost with all hands
Maritime incidents in October 1941